
Pabianice County is a unit of territorial administration and local government (powiat) in Łódź Voivodeship, central Poland. It came into being on January 1, 1999, as a result of the Polish local government reforms passed in 1998.

As of 2006 its total population is 119,008, out of which the population of Pabianice is 70,445, that of Konstantynów Łódzki is 17,564, and the rural population is 30,999.

Neighbouring counties
Pabianice County is bordered by Zgierz County to the north, the city of Łódź and Łódź East County to the east, Piotrków County to the south-east, Bełchatów County to the south, Łask County to the west, and Poddębice County to the north-west.

Administrative division
The county is subdivided into seven gminas (two urban and five rural). These are listed in the following table, in descending order of population.

References
 Polish official population figures 2006

 
Pabianice